The Politburo of the 17th Congress of the All-Union Communist Party (Bolsheviks) was in session from 1934 to 1939.

Composition

Members

Candidates

References

Politburo of the Central Committee of the Communist Party of the Soviet Union members
1934 establishments in the Soviet Union
1939 disestablishments in the Soviet Union